Heterochiton is an extinct genus of polyplacophoran mollusc. Heterochiton became extinct during the Jurassic period.

References 

Prehistoric chiton genera